Call It Off may refer to:
Call It Off (band), Dutch pop punk band
"Call It Off", a single from Ratchet by Shamir
"Call It Off", a song from The Con by Tegan and Sara